The Banu Fazara or Fazzara or Fezara or Fezzara were an Arab tribe whose original homeland was Najd.

Origins
According to Arab genealogical tradition, the progenitor of the Banu Fazara was Fazāra ibn Dhubyān ibn Baghīd ibn Rayth ibn Ghaṭafān. Thus the tribe belonged to the Dhubyan branch of the Ghatafan tribe, making the Fazara a north Arabian tribe. Its ancestral pasture grounds were in the Wadi al-Rumma region of the Najd in central Arabia.

History
In the pre-Islamic period, the Fazara were known for their rivalry with the Banu Abs, another branch of the Ghatafan. The two tribes fought against each other in the war of 'Dahis and Ghabra', so-called after the horses of the tribes' respective chiefs, Qays ibn Zuhayr ibn Jadhima of the Abs and Hudhayfa ibn Badr of the Fazara. According to the story of the war, the Fazara originally bested the Abs due to underhanded acts and the Abs retaliated by killing a brother of Hudhayfa. The latter, then his son Hisn, led the tribe during the long-running war. Peace was eventually established between the brother tribes, after which Fazara, under Hisn's son Uyayna, engaged in feuds with the Banu Amir, the Banu Jusham, and other groups.

The Fazara under Uyayna participated in the Qurayshite siege of the Islamic prophet Muhammad in Medina in 627. They later raided a Muslim expedition under Zayd ibn Haritha, and in 628, supported the Jews of Khaybar against the Muslims. By 630, Uyayna made peace with Muhammad and participated in the Muslim victories at Mecca and Hunayn. A Fazara delegation submitted to Muhammad, but after his death in 632, broke off allegiance from the Muslims and joined the rebel chief Tulayha in the Ridda Wars. The Muslims defeated them and the Fazara submitted once again to Muslim rule.

In the modern day, the Fazara section of the Sudanese Arabs are camel-nomadic Arab tribes who live in the pastures of North Kordofan. They include the Shanabla, Majaneen, Bani-Jarrar, and Bani-Dhubian.

Umm Qirfa

Umm Qirfa Fatima was a leader of the Banu Fazara Arab tribe from Wadi Al-Qura.

Ancient genealogies described Umm Qirfa as a member of the Banu Fazara. She married into the Banu Badr. According to Ibn Ishaq and al-Tabari, Umm Qirfa was wealthy. She was described as being an old woman with high social status and wife of Malik ibn Hudhayfa ibn Badr al-Fazari. After her thirty horsemen were defeated by Zayd ibn Haritha, Muhammad ordered Qirfa or her children to be slaughtered "by putting a rope into her two legs and to two camels and driving them until they rent her in two..." Two of her limbs were torn in to two by four camels, her severed head was later paraded all over the streets of Medina.

But the story is transmitted through weak chains of transmission.

As for the first narration, which was mentioned by al-Tabari, the sequence of its chain of transmission is as follows:

Muhammad bin Hamid Al-Razi → Ibn Ishaq → Abdullah bin Abi Bakr 

There are two problems with the chain.
Muhammad ibn Hamid al-Razi considered unreliable transmitter by Al-Nasa'i
, Abu Ishaq al-Jawzjani, and others.
Also, Ibn Ishaq narrates it on the authority of Abdullah Ibn Abu Bakr,  even though the time difference between them was 69 years.
Ali ibn Naayif Ash-Shahood in his book Al-Mufassal Fi Ar-Radd ‘Ala Shubuhaat A’daa’ Al-Islam states about this matter:

Al-Waqidi has been condemned as an untrustworthy narrator and has been frequently and severely criticized by scholars, thus his narrations have been abandoned by the majority of hadith scholars.  Yahya ibn Ma'een said: "Al-Waqidi narrated 20,000 false hadith about the prophet". Al-Shafi'i, Ahmad ibn Hanbal and Al-Albanisaid: "Al-Waqidi is a liar" while Al-Bukhari said he didn't include a single letter by Al-Waqidi in his hadith works.

On the other hand the story goes against the Prophet Muhammad's orders to merciful killing and forbid mutilation.

In, Safi-Ur-Rahman Al-Mubarakpuri in his book Ar-Raheeq Al-Makhtum tells that Umm Qirfa wanted to kill Muhammad:

References

Bibliography
 

Fazara
History of Nejd
Tribes of Arabia